is a Japanese model and actress.

Career
Omasa co-starred with Shōta Sometani in Natsuki Seta's 2010 film A Liar and a Broken Girl. She appeared in the 2011 film Paradise Kiss.

Filmography

Films

TV dramas
 Tokyo Girl Episode 6 "Tokyo Kashimashi Girls" (BS-i, 2006), Chiharu
 Isshō Wasurenai Monogatari Episode 2 "Million Films" (TV Asahi, 2006)
 Otona no Megane 11-gatsu "Mirai" (Chiba TV, 2006), Yūka Saionji
 Koi Suru Nichiyōbi: New Type (BS-TBS, 2006), Yuri Tsukino
 Episode 10 "Hitori Bocchi no Majo"
 Episode 12 "Majo no Christmas"
 Hana Yori Dango 2: Returns (TBS, 2007), Yuduki Morishita
 Koi Suru Nichiyōbi Season 3 (BS-TBS, 2007)
 Episode 21 "Chikakute Tōi Koi", Rena Terasaki
 Episode 26 "Shōwa Anime Daikōshin: Kimi ha Koi o Shinjireruka", Aya
 Keitai Deka Zenigatakai (BS-TBS, 2007), Kai Zenigata
 Sensei Dō (BS-TBS, 2007), Eri
 NEW TYPE: Tada, Ai no Tameni Episode 1 (TBS, 2008), Yuri Tsukino
 Sakura no Uta (BS-TBS, 2008), Aya
 Hachi-One Diver (Fuji TV, 2008), Ayumi Sugata
 Kaidan Shin Mimibukuro: Special Zekkyō-hen (BS-TBS, 2008)
 Vol1: "Boon", Natsumi Imoto
 Vol2: "Gee", Aki Matsushima
 Tokyo Girl (BS-TBS, 2008)
 Taiyo to Umi no Kyoshitsu (Fuji TV, 2008), Yukino Tsugihara
 Pocky 4 Sisters (BS-TBS, 2008), Aya Kidokoro
 Mei-chan no Shitsuji (Fuji TV, 2009), Rika Kayama
 Koi to Oshare to Otokonoko Episode 5 "Hare Tokidoki Ghost" (BS-TBS, 2009), Aya
 Buzzer Beat: Gakeppuchi no Hero (Fuji TV, 2009)
 Tantei X Karano Chōsenjō! Season 2, Episode 2 "Maison Casablanca" (NHK, 2009), Hatanaka
 Yamato Nadeshiko Shichi Henge (TBS, 2010), Sunako Nakahara
 Sandaime Akechi Kogorō: Kyō mo Akechi ga Korosareru Episode 3 (TBS, 2010), Hayakawa
 Misaki Number One! (NTV, 2011), Yui Sakurai
 Rokudenashi Blues (TBS, 2011), Chiaki Nanase
 Kaitō Royale (TBS, 2011), Karen Katagiri
 Strawberry Night Episode 2 and 3 "Migi Deha Naguranai" (Fuji TV, 2012), Miki Shimosaka
 Seinaru Kaibutsutachi (TV Asahi, 2012), Yōko Hirai
 Mikeneko Homes no Suiri (NTV, 2012), Harumi Katayama
 Kekkon Dōsōkai: Seaside Love (Fuji TV TWO, 2012), Mion Aiba
 Resident – 5-nin no Kenshui (TBS, 2012), Hinako Koiwai
 Vampire Heaven (TV Tokyo, 2013), Sakurako
 Sennyū Tantei Tokage Episode 3 (TBS, 2013), Mitsuki Nagata
 Yonimo Kimyona Monogatari: 2013 - Haru no Tokubetsu Hen "Kaidan no Hanako" (Fuji TV, 2013), Chisako Kotani
 Kamen Teacher (NTV, 2013), Ichimura Miki
 Yoru no Sensei (TBS, 2014), Runa Uena
 Nezumi, Edo wo hashiru Episode 5 (NHK, 2014), Osato(Guest)
 Suikyu Yankisu(Water Polo Yankees) (Fuji TV, 2014), Chiharu Aoyama
 Algernon ni Hanataba wo (TBS, 2015), Mai Koide
 Watashi Kekkon Dekinainjanakute, Shinaindesu (TBS, 2016), Rika Nomura
 Shizumanu Taiyō (Wowow, 2016)
Showa Genroku Rakugo Shinju (NHK G, 2018), Miyokichi
 Mikazuki (NHK, 2019)
 Enjoy Drinking Alone (Wowow, 2021), Mei Benikawa

Web dramas
 Kimi ga Ireba: Beautiful Love (BeeTV, 4 June 2010), Hinata
 Paradise Kiss: After School (6 May 2011), Miwako Sakurada

Radio dramas
 Voice of 11PM (Nippon Broadcasting System)
 Otona ni Narutte (From 13 October 2008 To 17 October 2008)
 Teammate (From 5 January 2009 To 9 January 2009)
 Sayonara Kaidan (From 9 March 2009 To 13 March 2009)

Music videos
 HAYABUSA - Miracle (17 May 2006)
 Sakura Merry-Men - Marguerite (21 February 2007)
 D-51 - Road (4 February 2009)
 D-Date - 5th Single Joker (22 February 2011)
 SHINee - Boys Meet U (21 August 2013)

Bibliography

Books
 Sabishii Yoru, Watashi ha Ōgoe de Detaramena Uta o Utau. (Taibundo, 7 August 2008), 
 New Type: Tada, Ai no Tameni (Taibundo, 17 November 2008), cover, 
 Tatsuo Hori - "Kaze Tachinu" (SDP Bunko, 21 September 2008), cover and gravure,

Magazines
 Non-no, Shueisha 1971-, as an exclusive model from January 2011
 Seventeen, Shueisha 1967-, as an exclusive model from 2007 to November 2010
 Bessatsu Margaret Shueisha 1964-
 Deluxe Margaret

Photobooks
 School Girl (Shinpūsha, August 2005), 
 Natsu Shōjo Pictorial Book (June 2006), 
 @me.(Angel Works) (SDP, 24 March 2007), Omnibus Photobook, 
 Aya Omasa First Photo Book (Kadokawa Group Publishing, 19 January 2011), 
 Aya Dictionary A to Z (SDP, 26 June 2012),

Awards
 13th Nikkan Sports Drama Grand Prix (2009) - Best Supporting Actress for TBS drama "Yamato Nadeshiko Shichi Henge"
 4th Gold Make-Up Awards in Category of Mode and Fashion (2012)

References

External links
 Official agency profile 
 

Japanese television actresses
Japanese female models
1991 births
Living people
People from Hokkaido
Stardust Promotion artists